Shahr-e Babak (also romanized as Shahr-e Bābak, Shahr-i-Bābak, and Shahr Bābak) is a city and capital of Shahr-e Babak County, Kerman Province, Iran.  At the 2006 census, its population was 43,916, in 10,401 families.

Situation

Shahr-e Babak is an ancient city in Iran. Historians believe this town has been built by Ardeshir Babakan, the most famous Sasanian king near 1,800 years ago. Maymand one of the 4 most oldest villages in Iran is 36 km far from Shahrbabak. Sarcheshmeh and Miedook, the biggest copper mines in Iran, are located around this town.

Shahr-e-Babak is located in the west part of the Kerman province, Iran. To its east is Rafsanjan, in its southern limits is Sirjan, and to the north and west has common borders with the province of Yazd. Shahr-e-Babak is one of the ancient cities of Iran, and its founder is said to be Babak (the father of Ardeshir Babakan). Such that ancient geographers have mentioned this city in their records, and others have related its historical past with that of Kerman.

Shahr-e-Babak was ruled by Nizari Ismailis about 200 years ago. Shahr-e-Babak is known as the Land of Copper. Shahr-e-Babak has many villages namely, Eshkoor, Barfeh, Hesarooyeh, Sohrab, Estabragh, Riseh, Paghaleh, etc.

Ayyoub's (Job's) Cave is located near Dehaj.

References

Populated places in Shahr-e Babak County
Cities in Kerman Province
History of Nizari Isma'ilism